Rugby Coq Mosan is a Belgian rugby union club currently competing in the Belgian Elite League.

The club is based in Berneau in the municipality of Dalhem near Liège in Belgium.
The official colours of the club are black and white.

History
The club was founded in 1967, has won the Belgian Elite League title on six occasions most recently in 1983 and have won the Belgian Cup four times.

In the 2011/12 season they finished the regular season as champions of Division Two and were therefore promoted in the Elite League.

Honours
 Belgian Elite League
 Champions: 1975, 1976, 1977, 1981, 1982, 1983
 Belgian Cup
 Champions: 1970, 1978, 1980,1989
 Belgian 2nd Division
 Champions: 1968, 1992, 2012

See also
 Rugby union in Belgium
 Belgian Elite League
 Belgian Cup (Rugby Union)

References
Official site

External links
 Official site

Belgian rugby union clubs
Dalhem